This is a list of seaplane operators. A seaplane is a powered fixed-wing aircraft capable of taking off and landing (alighting) on water. Seaplanes that can also take off and land on airfields are a subclass called amphibious aircraft.

Seaplane operators
Status:
 C - Currently operates seaplanes.
 F - Operating but no longer uses seaplanes.
 D - Defunct.

See also
List of flying boats and floatplanes
 Seaplane tender

References

 
Aviation-related lists